Gibraleón is a town and municipality located in the province of Huelva, Spain. According to the 2005 census, the municipality has a population of 11,202 inhabitants.

References

External links
Gibraleón - Sistema de Información Multiterritorial de Andalucía

Municipalities in the Province of Huelva